Tax Commissioner of New York can refer either to the Tax Commissioner of New York City, or the Tax Commissioner of New York State.

Tax Commissioner of New York City
The Tax Commission of New York City reviews property tax assessments that are set by the New York City Department of Finance.

Collin H. Woodward (?-1927) 1914 to ?.
Daniel S. McElroy (1852-1914) ? to 1914.
Lawson Purdy as president, and Frank Raymond circa 1908.
Nathaniel Sands circa 1880.
...
Michael Coleman (commissioner)
Theodore Sutro

Tax Commissioner of New York State
Now a division of the New York State Department of Taxation and Finance.
Isaac Low (1735–1791).
Thomas F. Byrnes, appointed 1911.
Mark Graves circa 1927.
John J. Merrill 1937
Thomas H. Mattox.

See also
Walz v. Tax Commission

References

External links
Official webpage